The Pontiac 6000 is a mid-size automobile manufactured and marketed by Pontiac for model years 1982 through 1991 in 2-door coupe, 4-door sedan and 5-door wagon body styles. The 6000 shared the front-wheel drive A platform with the Cutlass Ciera, Buick Century and Chevrolet Celebrity.  

The 6000 was manufactured at Oshawa Car Assembly in Ontario, Canada from 1981 to 1988, at Oklahoma City Assembly until production ended, and briefly at North Tarrytown Assembly.

For model year 1984, the 6000 led Pontiac's sales, with a production over 122,000, and was the last Pontiac to carry a numeric designation.  The 6000 was offered in a sporty variant, marketed as the 6000 STE, which was named to the Car and Driver Ten Best three times, from 1983 to 1985.

As part of their legacy, together the 6000 and the other A-bodies became enormously popular — as well as synonymous with GM's most transparent examples of badge engineering, highlighted almost indistinguishably on the August 22, 1983 cover of Forbes magazine as examples of genericized uniformity, embarrassing the company and ultimately prompting GM to recommit to design leadership.

Year to Year Changes

1982: Two trim levels were offered: 6000 and 6000 LE. Both came standard with the new-for-1982  Tech IV four-cylinder with throttle body injection. It made . Optional engines were GM's  V6 with a 2-barrel carburetor which made , or a  Oldsmobile diesel V6 which made .
1984: A station wagon known as the 6000 Safari was introduced to replace the rear-wheel drive Bonneville Safari wagon.
1985: A facelift meant a new fascia with a body-colored center section housing the Pontiac logo. The Tech IV was given various updates over the years but was mostly unchanged. The 4.3-liter diesel V6 was unpopular in light of General Motors diesel engine problems and was discontinued after 1985.
1986: The fuel-injected 2.8 made its way into the Base and LE models for the 1986 model year, however in these trims it only made . An S/E model arrived with the STE powertrain but fewer features; it was also available as a station wagon.
1987: The quad rectangular sealed beam headlamps were replaced with composite units. The taillights were updated with separate amber-colored turn signal indicators on the outboard side. 
1988: The coupe model was dropped; the rest of the line received equipment changes such as new "contour seats" for the LE.
1988: In Canada, an Olympic edition was offered on S/E models as a tie-in to the Calgary Winter Olympics. Offered only in monochrome white, with all blackout trim exterior painted white to match the body. The only interior colour trim was saddle, with an Olympic logo mounted on the B pillar.
1989: The 6000 received a more-rounded roofline, along with the Buick Century and Oldsmobile Cutlass Ciera, and was facelifted for the final time with slightly wider headlamps and a new grille. The taillights were replaced with the one from 6000STE.
1990: Passive front seatbelts were introduced and the  V6 originally only seen in the STE replaced the 2.8 across the board. After the STE model was dropped from the 6000 line for 1990, the S/E model gained its all wheel drive option. This was later dropped for the 1991 model year. 
1991: The 6000 is dropped, being replaced by the Grand Prix sedan. In addition, the Pontiac 6000 wagon was the final GM designed station wagon offering from Pontiac, as it was replaced by the Pontiac Trans Sport in 1990. The last Pontiac 6000 was assembled on July 22, 1991.

STE version

By 1984, Pontiac was in the midst of a resurgence as the division began to reassert its 1960s role as GM's performance brand. The 6000STE (Special Touring Edition) was introduced for the 1983 model year. 5-passenger seating with front captain seats and power windows were standard on this trim level (optional on some other trim levels). It featured a High-Output version of the 6000's optional 2.8 L V6. Like that engine, it sported a 2-barrel carburetor, though it delivered , rather than the usual 112 horsepower. Although intended to compete with similar entries from BMW, Audi, Toyota and Nissan, the 6000 used older technologies by comparison. The fuel system was carbureted (competitors had fuel injection) and gauge cluster lacked a tachometer. The 1984 6000STE featured a digital gauge cluster featuring a bar-graph tachometer. The STE featured a driver information center with a system which monitored functions such as lights, doors, tune-ups and tire rotations. For 1984, Road & Track called the 6000 STE one of the top twelve enthusiast cars.

Special steering rack, and suspension tuning with a self-leveling rear air suspension yielded handling performance comparable to European vehicles.  Four wheel disc brakes improved stopping as did standard Goodyear Eagle GT tires, size 195/70R14 (large for the time).

In 1985, the carbureted engine was replaced by a multi-port fuel injected version of the 2.8 L V6, still delivering . Although the 3-speed automatic remained standard (a Getrag 5-speed manual was a no charge option), the new engine accelerated faster than the previous engine.

For 1986, a revised front fascia with composite headlamps, anti-lock brakes, a revised tachometer, steering wheel mounted audio controls (the first of their kind) and a new 4-speed automatic transmission became available. Following this was a two-position memory seat for the 8-way power drivers seat for 1987. New for 1988 was an optional All Wheel Drive system. It was mated to a new 3.1 L LH0 V6 (the first use of GM's then-new 3.1 L in a production car) but only a 3-speed automatic transmission, which did not help acceleration or fuel economy. The all-wheel-drive system became standard for 1989, but was moved to the SE model for 1990, since the STE model name was discontinued from the 6000 line and moved to the new four-door Grand Prix lineup that year. The STE trim level was later discontinued from the Grand Prix after 1993.

Engines

Transmissions
1984–1986 Muncie 4-speed manual w/overdrive (only available on 2.5 L 4-cyl & 4.3 L diesel)
1984–1988 Muncie/Getrag 5T40/HM282 5-speed manual w/overdrive (only on 2.8 L V6)
1982–1991 Turbo Hydramatic 125C/3T40 3-speed automatic (Standard on all engines)
1985–1991 Turbo Hydramatic 440-T4/4T60 4-speed automatic with overdrive (optional only on V6 engines)

References

External links
GM A-body club and forum
 Yahoo Pontiac 6000 group

6000
Mid-size cars
Coupés
Sedans
Station wagons
All-wheel-drive vehicles
Front-wheel-drive vehicles
Cars introduced in 1982
1980s cars
1990s cars
Motor vehicles manufactured in the United States
Goods manufactured in Canada
Cars discontinued in 1991